Shadi Jamil (born 22 September 1955) is a Syrian singer from Aleppo who specializes in the Qudud Al Halabiyya genre. Shadi is known as one of the best Arabic singers especially in the Middle East.

Major works 
 Ensa Gharamak
 Ya Hbayeb
 Ayel mani Ayel
 Lesh Ana
 Toul el bunayyah
 Esmek ya Shahbah (for Aleppo)
 Qoumou ta nerkos Arabiyeh

References

1955 births
People from Aleppo
20th-century Syrian male singers
Living people